Gerhard Karl Eduard Stöck (28 July 1911 – 29 March 1985) was a German athlete. He won the javelin throw event at the 1936 Olympics and placed third in the shot put.

Stöck was the son of a butcher. He was born in Kaiserswalde in 1911, a small village now located in Poland, and grew up in the Province of Posen. He was a versatile athlete and, besides throwing events, competed in decathlon and won the javelin and pentathlon events at the 1935 World Student Games. Domestically, he won the German javelin title in 1938 and placed second in 1933–1947. He never won the German shot put title, due to a strong competition from Hans Woellke, and placed second four times. At the 1938 European Championships, Stöck won a silver medal in the shot put, surprisingly beating Woellke, but placed only seventh in the javelin throw.

Stöck had a degree in philology and, since 1938, worked as a teacher. Earlier in 1933, he became a member of the Nazi paramilitary organization, Sturmabteilung, and, in 1944, was promoted to Sturmbannführer. After World War II, he continued competing until the early 1950s and then worked as a sports administrator. He served as chef de mission of the Unified German Olympic team in 1956 and 1960 and as deputy chef de mission in 1964. His past military activity was raised only after his death in 1985. Among other things, it was found that he falsified his birth year from 1911 to 1910.

Stöck was married and raised an athletic family. His daughter, Jutta Stöck, became an Olympic sprinter, while his son-in-law, Peter Hertel, was a 1966 world champion in rowing. His grandson, Ole Hertel, was a competitive shot putter and discus thrower.

References

1911 births
1985 deaths
People from Piła County
People from the Province of Posen
German male javelin throwers
German male shot putters
Sturmabteilung officers
Olympic gold medalists for Germany
Olympic bronze medalists for Germany
Athletes (track and field) at the 1936 Summer Olympics
Olympic athletes of Germany
Sportspeople from Greater Poland Voivodeship
European Athletics Championships medalists
Medalists at the 1936 Summer Olympics
Olympic gold medalists in athletics (track and field)
Olympic bronze medalists in athletics (track and field)